A meat-free sausage roll (also known as a vegetarian sausage roll or vegan sausage roll) is a savoury pastry snack that contains a non-meat filling. The snack is an alternative to the conventional sausage roll that generally contains pork or beef. Meat-free sausage rolls are sold at retail outlets and are also available from bakeries as a take-away food.

Composition
The basic composition of a meat-free sausage roll is sheets of puff pastry formed into tubes around a meat substitute filling, before being baked.

Linda McCartney Foods produce meat-free sausage rolls based on soya.

In the UK in 2019, the bakery chain Greggs launched a meat-free sausage roll made using the mycoprotein mixture Quorn. It became one of the company's five best-selling products, and contributed to a 50% increase in their profits.

See also
 Vegetarian hot dog
Vegetarian bacon
Vegetarian sausage
Meat alternative

References

External links

 Veggie sausage rolls recipe at BBC Food

Meat substitutes
British snack foods
Street food
Fast food
Vegetarian cuisine
Vegan cuisine